Schuyler Otis Bland (May 4, 1872 – February 16, 1950) was a United States representative from Virginia. Born near Gloucester, Virginia, he attended the Gloucester Academy and the College of William and Mary. He was a teacher and a lawyer in private practice, and was elected as a Democrat to the Sixty-fifth Congress to fill the vacancy caused by the death of Representative William A. Jones. He was reelected to the Sixty-sixth and to the fifteen succeeding Congresses, serving from July 2, 1918 to February 16, 1950. While in the House, he was chair of the Committee on Merchant Marine and Fisheries (Seventy-third through Seventy-ninth Congresses and Eighty-first Congress). The United States Merchant Marine Academy Library is named in his honor.

Bland died of a cerebral hemorrhage at the Bethesda Naval Hospital in Bethesda, Maryland and was interred in Greenlawn Cemetery, Newport News, Virginia.

Early life
Schuyler Otis Bland was born May 4, 1872, on a farm in Gloucester County. His father, Schuyler Bland, a Confederate soldier, died a few years later. Educated at first by tutors, young Schuyler Otis entered Gloucester Academy at the age of 12 and afterwards matriculated at the College of William and Mary. During his senior year, he served as instructor in history, Latin and English. He won his Phi Beta Kappa key, but arranged his courses for the study of law, instead of working toward a degree.

After leaving college, he taught school in Accomac County, continued the study of law, and attended a summer law course at the University of Virginia. In 1899, he passed the State bar examination, and in 1900, began the practice of law in Newport News. Successful as a lawyer, he had a large private practice and served also on the legal staff of the Chesapeake and Ohio Railway. In 1914–15, he was vice-president of the Virginia Bar Association.

Political career
When Congressman William A. Jones died, Bland received the convention's nomination as his successor. He entered Congress, July 3, 1918, and was regularly re-elected until his death. Only 10 members of the House of Representatives have had longer continuous service. As chairman of the House Committee on Merchant Marine and Fisheries, Otis Bland was largely responsible for the Merchant Marine Act of 1936, which began the rehabilitation of American shipping. He is also a member of the Select Committee on Conservation of Wildlife Resources. His wife is the former Mary Crawford Putzel of Newport News.
(From archived newspaper clipping)

The Schuyler Otis Bland Memorial Library, located at the United States Merchant Marine Academy, which opened for service on March 17, 1969, was named after Representative Bland, a member of Congress from Virginia from 1918 until his death in 1950. From 1922 until 1950 Representative Bland was a member of the House Merchant Marine and Fisheries Committee, and its predecessor, serving as chairman for 16 years. Congressman Bland is principally remembered as "father of the Merchant Marine Act of 1936," the nation’s basic maritime statute.

In announcing the selection of the name of the library, Mr. J.W. Gulick, Acting Maritime Administrator, stated: "Naming the new library for Schuyler Otis Bland places before all users of this facility the name of an outstanding leader in the development of basic policies and programs to maintain an effective, efficient American Merchant Marine…His contribution to creative, dynamic thinking in relation to the American Merchant Marine, and his association through the Merchant Marine Act, with the establishment of goals and policy vital today for our merchant marine make his name particularly appropriate for the Academy Library, as a source for knowledge and ideas concerning the American Merchant Marine."  The ship SS Schuyler Otis Bland (T-AK-277) was named for him.

Elections
1918; Bland was elected to the U.S. House of Representatives unopposed.
1920; Bland was re-elected with 79.77% of the vote, defeating Republican S. P. Powell and Independent Edward Schade.
1922; Bland was re-elected with 83.57% of the vote, defeating Republicans George N. Wise and J.J. Jones.
1924; Bland was re-elected unopposed.
1926; Bland was re-elected unopposed.
1928; Bland was re-elected unopposed
1930; Bland was re-elected with 91.04% of the vote, defeating Independent W. A. Rowe.
1932; Bland was elected into Virginia's now defunct at-large Congressional district with the rest of the Democratic slate.
1934; Bland was re-elected in the 1st District with 91.44% of the vote, defeating Socialist Arthur W. Sowalter, Independent Rowe, and Communist Addison Gayle.
1936; Bland was re-elected with 80.87% of the vote, defeating Republican William A. Dickinson and Communist Gayle.
1938; Bland was re-elected unopposed.
1940; Bland was re-elected unopposed.
1942; Bland was re-elected unopposed.
1944; Bland was re-elected with 81.2% of the vote, defeating Republican Walter Johnson.
1946; Bland was re-elected with 74.97% of the vote, defeating republican Johnson.
1948; Bland was re-elected with 79.98% of the vote, defeating Republican Stanley G. Adams and Socialist J. Luther Kibler.

See also
 List of United States Congress members who died in office (1950–99)

References

"Memorial services held in the House of Representatives of the United States, together with remarks presented in eulogy of Schulyer Otis Bland, late a representative from Virginia frontispiece 1950"

1872 births
1950 deaths
Virginia lawyers
College of William & Mary alumni
Democratic Party members of the United States House of Representatives from Virginia
People from Gloucester County, Virginia
20th-century American lawyers
Burials in Greenlawn Memorial Park (Newport News, Virginia)